Partner Communications Company Ltd. doing business as Partner, formerly known as Orange Israel, is a mobile network operator, internet Wi-Fi, fixed telephony service and OTT/IPTV provider in Israel. It was formerly operating under the Orange brand name until 16 February 2016.

The company’s shares are traded on NASDAQ and the Tel Aviv Stock Exchange, where it is a constituent of the TA-35 Index, since August 2009, Scailex Corporation (owned by businessman Ilan Ben Dov) controls 51% of its shares., and in 2012 this stock of shares was sold to SB Telecom (owned by business man Haim Saban).

Operations
Partner Communications commenced full commercial operations in January 1999 and by 31 March 2001 had over 1 million subscribers, representing an estimated 21% of the cellular market in Israel at that time. As of June 2016 it has 2.7 million subscribers.

The prefix (area code) for Partner customers is 054, although customers who requested to keep their old number from a different cellular company may have a different area code, as required by law.

On 15 January 2007 Partner was granted a license to provide terrestrial telecommunications nationwide which gives it the option to operate a wired telephony; initially the service was provided for large businesses only.

On 1 January 2009, the company commercially launched its ISP services and Landline services (based on the Session Initiation Protocol) for private users and small businesses. These services rely on the combination of Nokia Siemens Network core services and Siemens Gigaset residential gateway. The combination of these allowed Partner to launch several unique services such as multiple calls on a single line, or *77 which allows users to choose whether to answer an incoming call on their home phone or their Orange mobile phone.

In 2017 Partner rolled out its high speed optic fiber internet structure with a 1GB connection.

Network

The Partner network utilizes GSM (900 MHz/1800 MHz), UMTS (900/2100 MHz) technology and for 3G services; an HSPA+ network that currently covers over 90% of the country, as well as an LTE network (1800 MHz).

Users of the network can use advanced services all over the world due to roaming agreements with 350 GSM and 130 UMTS international networks. 23% of the network users are business customers, 29% are pre-paid customers and the rest are private post-paid customers.

Brand ownership

The 'Orange' brand that the company used under license, belongs to Orange S.A. (formerly France Télécom), which is not related to the current owners of Partner. Orange had originally decided to let Partner keep using the name because of the network's wide commercial success and brand recognition, with a deal running through 2025, at a rate of NIS 15 million per year. This situation occurred following the sale of the Orange Group by Hutchison Whampoa, which did not include the holding in Hutchison Telecom.

But in June 2015 the CEO of Orange, Stephane Richard, stated he would "cancel [his] licensing deal with Israel tomorrow if [he] was able to." In the following days Richard stated his comments were taken out of context and he supported his deal with Israel and intended to maintain the deal. Richard later clarified his statements stating his comments were not politically motivated and meant only that he wished Orange to only be in countries which they operated and not licensing the name. On 12 June Richard visited Israel and met with Benjamin Netanyahu to personally apologize and to commit to their future partnership with Israel.

On 30 June 2015, Orange and Partner announced a change to their 10-year licensing agreement. Orange paid Partner NIS 168 million, to add an opt out clause to the contract, with which Partner intends to conduct a market survey which is determine the best course of action moving forward. In the first year only Partner can opt out, with either party being able to opt out in the second year. Regardless of which party opts to exercise the out clause, Orange will pay partner an additional NIS 210 million to end the arrangement. Orange stated that the money paid to Partner was purely for re-branding purposes and affirmed their previous statement that their wish to leave Israel is based on desire to discontinue license agreements and maintain only subsidiaries that they control, rather than a boycott.  Orange would make the relevant payments over the course of two years and charge it to their books as a mix of marketing, sales, customer services and related expenses. As part of the agreement Orange's research and development activities within Israel would transition to the Orange name, but would be restricted from entering the telecommunications services market.

On 11 February 2016, the new logo of Partner was unveiled. Partner officially began using their own brand on 16 February 2016.

History

Partner was founded in 1999 and was the third mobile network operator to enter the Israeli market, competing with the two incumbent operators - Cellcom (Founded 1994) and Pelephone (Founded 1986). When it was announced that the Ministry of Telecommunication would grant a third cellular network license it was thought that there is no room for another company; hence only two companies responded to the tender: Partner, and a group called "Tapuz". After losing its bid, Tapuz (which incidentally means "Orange" in Hebrew) became a part of Partner.

When it started operating in 1999, Partner was the first GSM cellular network in Israel (the others were using CDMA, TDMA, or iDEN technologies at that time), it allowed Israeli consumers to use their phones in other locations in the world with a similar network. The network was branded under the name "Orange" which was an international brand registered under the name of Hutchison Whampoa Hong-Kong, which was the major initial investor in the company. The successful launch and promotion of the Orange brand is considered one of the best advertising efforts undertaken in Israel.

Founding shareholders

The initial shareholders in the consortium that bid for the third cellular network license in Israel, in addition to Hutchison Telecom, were Elbit, MATAV (now part of HOT), Eurocom and Polar Communications.

2001 IPO

In November 1999, only 11 months after it began operating, Partner had an initial public offering on NASDAQ and the London Stock Exchange; the shares were listed under the symbol PTNR on NASDAQ and under the symbol PCCD on the London Stock Exchange. The company raised $604m, enabling the initial investor consortium to recoup a significant portion of their investment swiftly.

In 2001 the shares were also listed on the Tel Aviv Stock Exchange under the symbol PTNR and became a constitute of the TA-25 Index.

Hutchison takes full control

Through the years, the ownership of Partner Communications changed dramatically. The original Israeli partners sold the majority of their shares and eventually held only a small percentage of the company. Other than the public, the biggest shareholder became Hutchison Telecom (51.6%). The Egyptian company Orascom bought 20% of Hucthison, and as a result, held 9.99% of Partner's shares indirectly.

Sale to Scailex Corporation

During 2009 Hutchison decided to exit their investment in Partner and sold their 51% controlling stake to businessman Ilan Ben-Dov, who made his fortune holding the exclusive rights to market the Samsung mobile phones in Israel. The company was sold to Scailex Corporation (a company controlled by Ben-Dov) for NIS 5.29 billion (about USD $1.38 billion).

Acquisition of 012 Smile
In 2010, Partner acquired 012 Smile Telecom for NIS 1.45 billion, in the largest non-real-estate deal in Israel that year. 012 Smile was itself the product of a 2006 merger between 012 Golden Lines and Internet Gold's Smile Communications.

Criticism

Involvement in Israeli settlements

On 12 February 2020, the United Nations published a database of 112 companies helping to further Israeli settlement activity in the West Bank, including East Jerusalem, as well as in the occupied Golan Heights. These settlements are considered illegal under international law. Partner Communications was listed on the database on account of its "provision of services and utilities supporting the maintenance and existence of settlements" and "the use of natural resources, in particular water and land, for business
purposes" in these occupied territories.

On 5 July 2021, Norway's largest pension fund KLP said it would divest from Partner Communications together with 15 other business entities implicated in the UN report for their links to Israeli settlements in the occupied West Bank.

See also 
 Hutchison Telecommunications International
 Communications in Israel
 List of mobile network operators of Israel
 Golan Telecom

References

External links
 Partner official website 

Mobile phone companies of Israel
Partner Communications
Companies listed on the Nasdaq
Israeli brands
Internet service providers of Israel